The Barnsley Pals were two British Army Pals battalions during the First World War.

They were formed as the 13th (1st Barnsley Pals) and 14th (2nd Barnsley Pals) Battalions of the York and Lancaster Regiment. These two Pals battalions were brigaded with the Sheffield City Battalion (12th Battalion of the York and Lancaster Regiment) and the Accrington Pals (11th Battalion, East Lancashire Regiment) in the 94th Brigade of the 31st Division.

The 31st Division was sent to Egypt to guard the Suez Canal before being shipped to France in March 1916.

Both Barnsley Pals battalions took part in the attack on Serre on the first day of the Somme campaign. The 31st Division suffered 3,600 casualties and failed to achieve any of its objectives. The Barnsley Pals were the two support battalions for the Sheffield City Battalion and the Accrington Pals. The 1st Barnsley Pals suffered 275 casualties while the 2nd Barnsley Pals suffered 270 casualties on 1 July 1916.

References

External links
Webmatters Site on Pals Battalions
Pals site

Pals battalions
Infantry battalions of the British Army
Military units and formations established in 1914
Military units and formations disestablished in 1919
Military units and formations in the West Riding of Yorkshire
Military history of South Yorkshire
History of Barnsley